Law and Justice is a Georgian political party, which was established on 10 March 2019. The party leader is Tako Charkviani. The co-founders of the party are: Human Rights Defender Mikheil Ramishvili and Irakli Ghlonti. It was a member of the coalition "Strength Is in Unity" until 2020, when it joined with New Georgia to form the coalition Strategy Aghmashenebeli. The party is pro-European and plans to take part in the 2020 parliamentary elections.

History
On 10 March 2019, the founding congress of the Association "Law and Justice" was held.

Leaders
 Tako Charkviani (10 March 2019-)

Local election

References

2019 establishments in Georgia (country)
Centre-right parties in Georgia (country)
Political parties established in 2019
Political parties in Georgia (country)
Pro-European political parties in Georgia (country)